The 2012–13 Russian Cup, known as the 2012–13 Pirelli–Russian Football Cup for sponsorship reasons, was the 21st season of the Russian football knockout tournament since the dissolution of Soviet Union.

The competition started on July 11, 2012 and finished with the final held on June 1, 2013. The cup champion wins a spot in the 2013–14 UEFA Europa League group stage.

First round
This round featured 35 Second Division teams and 1 amateur team. The game was played July 11, 15, 16 and 17, 2012.

West Section

Center Section

South Section

Ural-Povolzhye Section

East section

Second round
In this round entered 18 winners from the First Round and 38 Second Division teams. The matches were played from July 29 to August 5, 2012.

West Section

Center Section

South Section

Ural-Povolzhye Section

East Section

Third round
In this round entered 28 winners from the Second Round. The matches were played from August 10 to August 18, 2012.

West Section

Center Section

South Section

Ural-Povolzhye Section

East Section

Fourth round
The 14 winners from the Third Round and the 17 FNL teams entered this round. The matches were played on September 1–2, 2012.

|}

Round of 32
The 16 winners from the Fourth Round hosted the 2012–13 Russian Premier League teams in this round. The matches were played on September 25–27, 2012.

The game was stopped in the first half and eventually abandoned in the 50th minute due to Torpedo fans throwing fireworks on the field during the celebrations of Boyarintsev's goal and was later awarded to Dynamo.

Round of 16
The 16 winners from the Round of 32 round entered. The matches were played on October 30–31, 2012.

Quarter-finals
The 8 winners from the Round of 16 round entered. The matches will be played on April 17–18, 2013. The home teams in Dynamo – Anzhi and Rostov – Terek pairs were determined in a draw held on November 7, 2012. CSKA and Zenit will be home teams in their pairs due to playing more away games than Yenisey and Kuban respectively in earlier rounds. Yenisey from the National Championship is the lowest ranked team left in the competition.

Semi-finals
The four winners from the quarter-finals entered the semi-finals. The matches were played on 6 May 2013. The home teams in Zenit, Anzhi, Rostov and CSKA pairs were determined in a draw held on 18 April 2012. Zenit and Rostov will be home teams in their pairs due to playing more away games than Yenisey and Kuban respectively in earlier rounds. All teams are from the Russian Premier League.

Final

Played in the earlier stages, but were not on the final game squad:

PFC CSKA Moscow: Sergei Ignashevich (DF),  Mário Fernandes (DF),  Kim In-sung (MF), Ravil Netfullin (MF),  Elvir Rahimić (MF),  Zoran Tošić (MF), Konstantin Bazelyuk (FW), Dmitri Yefremov (FW),  Sekou Oliseh (FW).

FC Anzhi Makhachkala: Arseniy Logashov (DF), Georgy Gabulov (MF), Nikita Burmistrov (FW),  Shamil Lakhiyalov (FW), Serder Serderov (FW), Fyodor Smolov (FW).

External links

 Official page 

Russian Cup seasons
Cup
Russian Cup